Martin Pike is the name of

 Martin Pike (athlete) (1920–1997), British sprinter
 Martin Pike (English footballer) (born 1964), English footballer
 Martin Pike (Australian footballer) (born 1972), Australian rules footballer